The chief minister of Bangsamoro is the executive head of the Bangsamoro Autonomous Region in Muslim Mindanao, an autonomous region within the Philippines.

The current chief minister is Murad Ebrahim, who serves in an interim basis as head of the Bangsamoro Transition Authority, the interim local government body of the Bangsamoro region. He took oath as the first and interim chief minister along with the rest of the members of the regional body before President Rodrigo Duterte on February 22, 2019.

Background

Function
The chief minister is the head official who represents the government of the Bangsamoro Autonomous Region, and the position is constituted by the Bangsamoro Organic Law (BOL). The holder of the post appoints the heads of the Bangsamoro regional government's ministries, agencies, bureaus and other offices. The chief minister could also formulate a platform that would need to be approved by the Bangsamoro Parliament and has the power to issue executive orders and other policies. The holder of the position could also proclaim a state of calamity in the region.

The holder of the position also holds ex-officio memberships in other government bodies controlled by the national government, such as the Mindanao Development Authority, the National Security Council, and the National Economic and Development Authority and represents the regional interest of the Bangsamoro. The chief minister is also a member of the Council of Leaders, which, according to the BOL, "shall advice the chief minister on matters of government in the Bangsamoro region".

The chief minister can also indirectly dissolve the parliament by advising the wali, who has the legal authority to dissolve the legislature. As per law, the holder is also to be assisted by two deputy chief ministers who are to be nominated by the chief minister themselves and elected by the parliament. The deputies are required by law to hail from a different sub-region from the chief minister. The chief minister's power of appointment is codified in regional law through Bangsamoro Act No. 11, which states that the official has powers to appoint regional government positions that have a salary grade of 25 and above unless otherwise stated by law.

Eligibility
Only a member of the Bangsamoro Parliament, who is at least 25 years of age at the time of election, and a natural born citizen of the Philippines, is eligible to be elected as chief minister. The parliament is yet to hold an election with the region being led by an interim chief minister appointed by the president of the Philippines.

Bangsamoro is set to have a regular set of elected officials by 2022.

List

References

Government in Bangsamoro
Governors of regions of the Philippines
Bangsamoro